Tom Kruse may refer to:

Tom Kruse (mailman) (1914–2011), Australian mailman, featured in documentary The Back of Beyond
Tom Kruse (inventor) (fl. 1992), inventor of the Hoveround, a type of electric wheelchair

See also 
Tom Cruise (born 1962), American actor
Thomas Cruise (footballer) (born 1991), English footballer
Tom Cruse (rugby union) (born 1989), English rugby union player
Thomas Cruse (1857–1943), U.S. general
Com Truise, American musician